Piedmont Technical College is a public community college with its main campus in Greenwood, South Carolina.  It serves seven counties in the Lakelands region of South Carolina.  Six additional County Centers also serve students in Abbeville County, Edgefield County, Laurens County, McCormick County, Newberry County, and Saluda County. Piedmont Technical College serves the largest geographic area of any institution in the South Carolina Technical College System. The college was founded in 1966.

Campuses 
 Lex Walters Campus (Greenwood, SC)
 Abbeville County Center (Abbeville, SC)
 Edgefield County Center (Edgefield, SC)
 Laurens County Higher Education Center (Clinton, SC)
 McCormick County Center (McCormick, SC)
 Newberry County Center (Newberry, SC)
 Saluda County Center (Saluda, SC)

External links 
 Official website

Universities and colleges accredited by the Southern Association of Colleges and Schools
Education in Greenwood County, South Carolina
Education in Abbeville County, South Carolina
Education in Edgefield County, South Carolina
Education in Laurens County, South Carolina
Education in McCormick County, South Carolina
Education in Newberry County, South Carolina
Education in Saluda County, South Carolina
South Carolina Technical College System
Buildings and structures in Greenwood, South Carolina